Mollaayrım (also, Molla Ayrım and Mollaayrum) is a village and municipality in the Tovuz Rayon of Azerbaijan.  It has a population of 253.

References 

Populated places in Tovuz District